The Town of Gilcrest is a Statutory Town located in Weld County, Colorado, United States. The town population was 1,029 at the 2020 United States Census. Gilcrest is a part of the Greeley, CO Metropolitan Statistical Area and the Front Range Urban Corridor.

History
A post office called Gilcrest has been in operation since 1907. The community has the name of W. K. Gilcrest, a businessperson in the banking industry.

Geography
Gilcrest is located at  (40.283190, -104.778780).

Demographics

As of the census of 2000, there were 1,162 people, 329 households, and 271 families residing in the town. The racial makeup of the town was 62.74% White, 0.34% African American, 1.72% Native American, 0.09% Asian, 32.19% from other races, and 2.93% from two or more races. Hispanic or Latino of any race were 54.91% of the population.

There were 329 households, out of which 52.0% had children under the age of 18 living with them, 68.7% were married couples living together, 9.4% had a female householder with no husband present, and 17.6% were non-families. 14.9% of all households were made up of individuals, and 6.7% had someone living alone who was 65 years of age or older.  The average household size was 3.53 and the average family size was 3.86.

In the town, the population was spread out, with 36.1% under the age of 18, 10.2% from 18 to 24, 31.2% from 25 to 44, 17.0% from 45 to 64, and 5.6% who were 65 years of age or older.  The median age was 28 years. For every 100 females, there were 109.4 males.  For every 100 females age 18 and over, there were 105.5 males.

The median income for a household in the town was $45,625, and the median income for a family was $45,750. Males had a median income of $28,750 versus $21,726 for females. The per capita income for the town was $12,863.  About 9.3% of families and 15.5% of the population were below the poverty line, including 20.6% of those under age 18 and 8.9% of those age 65 or over.

See also

Colorado
Bibliography of Colorado
Index of Colorado-related articles
Outline of Colorado
List of counties in Colorado
List of municipalities in Colorado
List of places in Colorado
List of statistical areas in Colorado
Front Range Urban Corridor
North Central Colorado Urban Area
Denver-Aurora, CO Combined Statistical Area
Greeley, CO Metropolitan Statistical Area

References

External links

Town of Gilcrest website
CDOT map of the Town of Gilcrest

Towns in Colorado
Towns in Weld County, Colorado